Mircea Ionescu-Quintus (18 March 1917 – 15 September 2017) was a Romanian politician who served as a senator and Minister of Justice. He also was chairman of the National Liberal Party (PNL) from 1993 to 2001. Ionescu-Quintus turned 100 in March 2017, and died six months later.

References

External links
  Biography

1917 births
2017 deaths
20th-century Romanian politicians
Chairpersons of the National Liberal Party (Romania)
Members of the Senate of Romania
Men centenarians
Politicians from Kherson
Presidents of the Senate of Romania
Romanian centenarians
Romanian philatelists